Frank Millar (1925 – 13 May 2001) was a Northern Irish unionist politician.

Millar worked in the shipyards, where he became a shop steward, before becoming a founder member of Ulster Protestant Action in 1956.

Millar was first elected to Belfast City Council in 1972, representing Dock, then the Antrim and Shore Road areas.  He held his seat at each subsequent election until retiring in 1993.  He was Deputy Lord Mayor of Belfast in 1981-2 and 1992-3.

Millar was also elected to the Northern Ireland Assembly in 1973 for Belfast North 
as an Ulster Unionist Party anti-Sunningdale Agreement candidate. He held his seat on the Northern Ireland Constitutional Convention in 1975 as an independent Unionist, and for the 1982 Northern Ireland Assembly.

In 1986, Millar was fined £100 for describing supporters of Cliftonville F.C. as "Republican bastards".  Two years later, he called for Irish Travellers to be "incinerated", while in 1989, he was fined £50 for punching Democratic Unionist Party councillor Sammy Wilson.  He also faced criticism for describing Nelson Mandela as a "black Provo", and gay people as "deviants".

In the late 1980s, Millar campaigned against the privatisation of the Harland and Wolff shipyard.

Millar's son, Frank Millar Jr, was also an Ulster Unionist Party Assembly member.

References

|-

1925 births
2001 deaths
Members of Belfast City Council
Members of the Northern Ireland Assembly 1973–1974
Members of the Northern Ireland Constitutional Convention
Northern Ireland MPAs 1982–1986
Independent politicians in Northern Ireland
Ulster Protestant Action members
Ulster Unionist Party councillors